Meteor Rain  is the debut Mandarin studio album of Taiwanese Mandopop quartet boy band F4. It was released on 28 August 2001 by Sony Music Taiwan. The Hong Kong version of the album is an audio visual CD (AVCD) which includes two music videos.

The album is organized in the style of a split album with two tracks by each of the F4 members and two tracks collectively as F4. The leading track "" (Meteor Rain, a Chinese cover song of Gaining Through Losing by Ken Hirai) is listed at number 11 on Hit Fm Taiwan's Hit Fm Annual Top 100 Singles Chart for 2001 as well as the theme song for the 2001 Taiwanese drama series of the same title.

The album was awarded one of the Top 10 Selling Mandarin Albums of the Year at the 2002 IFPI Hong Kong Album Sales Awards, presented by the Hong Kong branch of IFPI. Following the success of their TV series Meteor Garden, the album also received commercial acclaim in Indonesia with sales of more than 300,000 copies.

Track listing
 "" liu xing yu (Meteor Rain) - F4
 "" wo shi zhen de zhen de hen ai ni (I Truly Love You/I Really Really Love You) - Jerry
 "Here We Are" - Ken
 "" shui rang ni liu lei (Who Made You Cry?) - Vanness
 "" wei ni zhi zhuo (Persistence For You) - Vic
 "" di yi shi jian (At The First Place) - F4
 "" yao ding ni (Got To Have You) - Jerry
 "" ni bu ai wo ai shui (Everywhere/Who Do You Love If Not Me?) - Vanness
 "" ai bu hui yi zhi deng ni (Show Me Your Love/Love Will Not Wait For You) - Ken
 "" zui te bie de cun zai (The Most Special Existence) - Vic

Music videos
 "" (Meteor Rain) MV
 "" (At the First Place) MV

Controversy
The group's label Sony Music Taiwan encountered controversy in October 2002 when South Korean media noted the similarities between the song "Everywhere" and the popular Korean song "Love and Remember", which was originally recorded by best-selling K-pop group g.o.d in 1999 as part of their second album and was composed by their producer Park Jin-young. Park filed a lawsuit against Sony Music Taiwan, stating that the song had been remade without his permission. Sony Music Taiwan disputed the case on the grounds that they had purchased the rights from Universal Music, as "Love and Remember" was partly based on Curtis McKonly's arrangement of the Christmas carol "The First Noel". The case was eventually settled out of court when Park was paid compensation by Sony Music Taiwan as they used Park's arrangement of the song.

Notes

References

2001 debut albums
F4 (band) albums
Sony Music Taiwan albums